

Events

January

 January 1 – Bogle–Chandler case: Commonwealth Scientific and Industrial Research Organisation scientist Dr. Gilbert Bogle and Mrs. Margaret Chandler are found dead (presumed poisoned), in bushland near the Lane Cove River, Sydney, Australia.
 January 2 – Vietnam War – Battle of Ap Bac: The Viet Cong win their first major victory.  
 January 9 – A total penumbral lunar eclipse is visible in the Americas, Europe, Africa, and Asia, and is the 56th lunar eclipse of Lunar Saros 114. Gamma has a value of −1.01282. It occurs on the night between Wednesday, January 9 and Thursday, January 10, 1963.
 January 13 – 1963 Togolese coup d'état: A military coup in Togo results in the installation of coup leader Emmanuel Bodjollé as president.
 January 17 – A last quarter moon occurs between the penumbral lunar eclipse and the annular solar eclipse, only 12 hours, 29 minutes after apogee.
 January 19 – Soviet spy Gheorghe Pintilie is removed from his position as Deputy Interior Minister of the Romanian People's Republic, as a step in ensuring Romania's political independence; the Workers' Party Politburo discusses way of neutralizing "Soviet intelligence networks [...] which Gheorghe Pintilie had coordinated."
 January 22 – France and West Germany sign the Élysée Treaty.
 January 25 – A large annular solar eclipse covered 99.5% of the Sun and a narrow path at most 19.6 km (12.2 mi). It was visible in Chile, Argentina, South Africa, Madagascar, and was the 26th solar eclipse of Solar Saros 140. Gamma had a value of -0.48984.
 January 26 – The Australia Day shootings rock Perth; 2 people are shot dead and 3 others injured by Eric Edgar Cooke.
 January 29 – French President Charles de Gaulle vetoes the United Kingdom's entry into the European Common Market.

February

 February 5 – The European Court of Justice's ruling in Van Gend en Loos v Nederlandse Administratie der Belastingen establishes the principle of direct effect, one of the basic tenets of European Union law.
 February 8 – Travel, financial and commercial transactions by United States citizens to Cuba are made illegal by the John F. Kennedy Administration.
 February 10 – Five Japanese cities located on the northernmost part of Kyūshū are merged and become the city of Kitakyūshū, with a population of more than 1 million.
 February 12 – Northwest Airlines Flight 705 crashes in the Florida Everglades, killing all 43 aboard.
 February 14 – Harold Wilson becomes leader of the opposition Labour Party in the United Kingdom; in October 1964 he becomes prime minister. 
 February 21 – The 5.6  Marj earthquake affects northern Libya with a maximum Mercalli intensity of VIII (Severe), causing 290–375 deaths and 375–500 injuries.
 February 27 – Juan Bosch takes office as the 41st president of the Dominican Republic.

March

 March 4 – In Paris, six people are sentenced to death for conspiring to assassinate President Charles de Gaulle. De Gaulle pardons five, but the other conspirator, Jean Bastien-Thiry, is executed by firing squad several days later.
 March 17 – Mount Agung erupts on Bali, killing approximately 1,500.
 March 23 – "Dansevise" by Grethe & Jørgen Ingmann (music by Otto Francker, text by Sejr Volmer-Sørensen) wins the Eurovision Song Contest 1963 for Denmark.
 March 30 – Indigenous Australians are legally allowed to drink alcohol in New South Wales.

April

 April 7 – Yugoslavia is proclaimed to be a socialist republic, and Josip Broz Tito is named President for Life.
 April 8 – The 35th Academy Awards ceremony is held. Lawrence of Arabia wins Best Picture.
 April 11 – Pope John XXIII issues his final encyclical, Pacem in terris, entitled On Establishing Universal Peace in Truth, Justice, Charity and Liberty, the first papal encyclical addressed to "all men of good will", rather than to Roman Catholics only.
 April 12 – The Soviet nuclear powered submarine K-33 collides with the Finnish merchant vessel M/S Finnclipper in the Danish Straits. Although severely damaged, both vessels make it to port.
 April 14 – The Institute of Mental Health (Belgrade) is established.
 April 16 – Martin Luther King, Jr. issues his "Letter from Birmingham Jail".
 April 20 – In Quebec, Canada, members of the terrorist group Front de libération du Québec bomb a Canadian Army recruitment center, killing night watchman Wilfred V. O'Neill.
 April 21–23 – The first election of the Supreme Institution of the Baháʼí Faith (known as the Universal House of Justice, whose seat is at the Baháʼí World Centre on Mount Carmel in Haifa, Israel) is held.
 April 22 – Lester Bowles Pearson becomes the 14th Prime Minister of Canada.
 April 28 – 1963 general election is held in Italy.
 April 29 – Buddy Rogers becomes the first WWWF Champion.

May

 May 1 – The Coca-Cola Company introduces its first diet drink, Tab cola.
 May 2 – Berthold Seliger launches near Cuxhaven a 3-stage rocket with a maximum flight altitude of more than 62 miles (the only sounding rocket developed in Germany).
 May 4 – The Le Monde Theater fire in Dioirbel, Senegal, kills 64 people.
 May 8 – Huế Phật Đản shootings: The Army of the Republic of Vietnam opens fire on Buddhists who defy a ban on the flying of the Buddhist flag on Vesak, the birthday of Gautama Buddha, killing 9. Earlier, President Ngô Đình Diệm allowed the flying of the Vatican flag in honour of his brother, Archbishop Ngô Đình Thục, triggering the Buddhist crisis in South Vietnam.
 May 13 – A smallpox outbreak hits Stockholm, Sweden, lasting until July.
 May 14 – Kuwait becomes the 111th member of the United Nations.
 May 15 – Project Mercury: NASA launches Gordon Cooper on Mercury-Atlas 9, the last Mercury mission (on June 12 NASA Administrator James E. Webb tells Congress the program is complete).
 May 22 – A.C. Milan beats Benfica 2–1 at Wembley Stadium, London and wins the 1962–63 European Cup (football).
 May 23 – Fidel Castro visits the Soviet Union.
 May 25 – The Organisation of African Unity is established in Addis Ababa, Ethiopia.

June

 June 3 – Huế chemical attacks: The Army of the Republic of Vietnam rains liquid chemicals on the heads of Buddhist protestors, injuring 67 people. The United States threatens to cut off aid to the regime of Ngô Đình Diệm.
 June 4 – President of the United States John F. Kennedy signs Executive Order 11110, authorizing the Secretary of the Treasury to continue issuing silver certificates.
 June 5 – The first annual National Hockey League Entry Draft is held in Montreal.
 June 10 – In the United States:
 President John F. Kennedy signs the Equal Pay Act of 1963 into law.
 President John F. Kennedy delivers his American University speech, "A Strategy of Peace", in Washington, D.C.
 The University of Central Florida is established by the Florida legislature.
 June 11 – In Saigon, Buddhist monk Thích Quảng Đức commits self-immolation to protest the oppression of Buddhists by the Ngô Đình Diệm administration.
 June 13 
 The cancellation of Mercury-Atlas 10 effectively ends the United States' manned spaceflight Project Mercury.
 The New York Commodity Exchange begins trading silver futures contracts.
 June 15 – The AC Cobra makes its first appearance at the 24 Hours of Le Mans. It will go on to win its class the following year.
 June 16 – Vostok 6 carries Soviet cosmonaut Valentina Tereshkova, the first woman into space.
 June 19 – Valentina Tereshkova the first woman in space, returns to Earth, landing in the Soviet Union.
 June 20
 Establishment of the Moscow–Washington hotline (officially, the Direct Communications Link or DCL; unofficially, the "red telephone"; and in fact a teleprinter link) is authorized by signing of a Memorandum of Understanding in Geneva by representatives of the Soviet Union and the United States.
 Swedish Air Force Colonel Stig Wennerström is arrested as a spy for the Soviet Union.
 June 21 – Pope Paul VI (Giovanni Battista Montini) succeeds Pope John XXIII as the 262nd pope.
 June 26
 John F. Kennedy gives his "Ich bin ein Berliner" speech in West Berlin, Germany.
 David Ben-Gurion is replaced by Levi Eshkol as prime minister of Israel.

July

 July 1 – ZIP codes are introduced by the United States Postal Service.
 July 5 – Diplomatic relations between the Israeli and the Japanese governments are raised to embassy level.
 July 7 – Double Seven Day scuffle: Secret police loyal to Ngô Đình Nhu, brother of President Ngô Đình Diệm, attack American journalists including Peter Arnett and David Halberstam at a demonstration during the Buddhist crisis in South Vietnam.
 July 11 – South Africa: police raid Liliesleaf Farm to the north of Johannesburg, arresting a group of African National Congress leaders.
 July 19 – American test pilot Joe Walker, flying the X-15, reaches an altitude of 65.8 miles (105.9 kilometers), making it a sub-orbital spaceflight by recognized international standards.
 July 26
 An earthquake in Skopje, Yugoslavia (present-day North Macedonia) leaves 1,800 dead.
 NASA launches Syncom 2, the world's first geostationary (synchronous) satellite.
 July 30 – The Soviet newspaper Izvestia reports that British diplomat and double agent Kim Philby has been given asylum in Moscow.

August

 August 5 – The United States, United Kingdom and Soviet Union sign the Partial Nuclear Test Ban Treaty.
 August 8 – The Great Train Robbery takes place in Buckinghamshire, England.
 August 14 – A huge and devastating forest fire hits the region around Paraná State, Brazil. According to government documents, two million hectares (4.94 million acres) were lost to burning and 110 persons perished.
 August 15 – Trois Glorieuses: President Fulbert Youlou is overthrown in the Republic of Congo after a three-day uprising in the capital, Brazzaville.
 August 21 – Xá Lợi Pagoda raids: The Army of the Republic of Vietnam Special Forces loyal to Ngô Đình Nhu, brother of President Ngô Đình Diệm, vandalise Buddhist pagodas across South Vietnam, arresting thousands and leaving an estimated hundreds dead. In the wake of the raids, the Kennedy administration by Cable 243 orders the United States Embassy, Saigon to explore alternative leadership in the country, opening the way towards a coup against Diệm.
 August 22 – American test pilot Joe Walker again achieves a sub-orbital spaceflight according to international standards, this time by piloting the X-15 to an altitude of 67.0 miles (107.8 kilometers).
 August 24 – First games played in the Bundesliga, the primary professional Association football league in West Germany, replacing the Oberliga.
 August 28 – Martin Luther King Jr. delivers his "I Have a Dream" speech on the steps of the Lincoln Memorial to an audience of at least 250,000, during the March on Washington for Jobs and Freedom. It is, at that point, the single largest protest in American history.

September

 September 1 – Establishment of language areas and facilities in Belgium comes into effect. This will become the foundation for further state reform in Belgium.
 September 6 – The Centre for International Intellectual Property Studies (CEIPI) is founded.
 September 10 – Sicilian Mafia boss Bernardo Provenzano is indicted for murder (he is captured 43 years later, on April 11, 2006).
 September 15 – American civil rights movement: The 16th Street Baptist Church bombing, in Birmingham, Alabama, kills 4 and injures 22.
 September 16 – Malaysia is formed through the merging of the Federation of Malaya and the British crown colony of Singapore, North Borneo (renamed Sabah) and Sarawak.
 September 18 – Rioters burn down the British Embassy in Jakarta, to protest the formation of Malaysia.
 September 23 – King Fahd University of Petroleum and Minerals is established by a Saudi Royal Decree as the College of Petroleum and Minerals.
 September 24 – The United States Senate ratifies the Partial Nuclear Test Ban Treaty.
 September 25 – In the Dominican Republic, Juan Bosch is deposed by a coup d'état led by the military with civilian support.
 September 29 – The second period of the Second Vatican Council in Rome opens.

October

 October 1 – U.S. President John F. Kennedy toasts Emperor Haile Selassie at a luncheon in Rockville, Maryland.
 October 2
 Nigeria becomes a republic; The 1st Republican Constitution is established.
 The Presidential Commission on the Status of Women in the United States issues its final reports to President Kennedy.
 October 3 – 1963 Honduran coup d'état: A violent coup in Honduras pre-empts the October 13 election, ends a period of reform under President Ramón Villeda Morales and begins two decades of military rule under General Oswaldo López Arellano.
 October 4 – Hurricane Flora, one of the worst Atlantic storms in history, hits Hispaniola and Cuba, killing nearly 7,000 people.
October 7 – Buddhist crisis: Amid worsening relations, outspoken South Vietnamese First Lady Madame Ngo Dinh Nhu arrives in the US for a speaking tour, continuing a flurry of attacks on the Kennedy administration.
 October 9 – In northeast Italy, over 2,000 people are killed when a large landslide behind the Vajont Dam causes a giant wave of water to overtop it.
 October 10 – Partial Nuclear Test Ban Treaty, signed on August 5, takes effect.
 October 14 – A revolution starts in Radfan, South Yemen, against British colonial rule.
 October 16 – Ludwig Erhard replaces Konrad Adenauer as Chancellor of West Germany.
 October 19 – Alec Douglas-Home succeeds Harold Macmillan as Prime Minister of the United Kingdom.
 October 24 – Fire at the Soviet Union's Baikonur Cosmodrome in an R-9 Desna underground missile silo; seven people are killed.
 October 30 – The car manufacturing firm Lamborghini is founded in Italy.
 October 31 – 1963 Indiana State Fairgrounds Coliseum gas explosion: 81 die in a gas explosion during a Holiday on Ice show at the Indiana State Fairgrounds Coliseum in Indianapolis, United States.

November

 November 1 – Arecibo Observatory, a radio telescope, officially begins operation in Puerto Rico.
 November 2 – 1963 South Vietnamese coup: Arrest and assassination of Ngo Dinh Diem, the South Vietnamese President.
 November 6 – 1963 South Vietnamese coup: Coup leader General Dương Văn Minh takes over as leader of South Vietnam.
 November 7 – 11 German miners are rescued from a collapsed mine after 14 days in what becomes known as the "Wunder von Lengede" ("miracle of Lengede").
 November 8 – Finnair aircraft OH-LCA crashes before landing at Mariehamn Airport on Åland.
 November 9 – Two disasters in Japan:
 Miike coal mine explosion: A coal mine explosion kills 458 and sends 839 carbon monoxide poisoning victims to the hospital.
 Tsurumi rail accident: A triple train disaster in Yokohama kills 161.
 November 10 – Malcolm X makes an historic speech in Detroit, Michigan ("Message to the Grass Roots").
 November 14 – A volcanic eruption under the sea near Iceland creates a new island, Surtsey.

 November 22
 Assassination of John F. Kennedy: In a motorcade in Dallas, Texas, U.S. President John F. Kennedy is fatally shot by Lee Harvey Oswald, and Governor of Texas John Connally is seriously wounded at 12:30 CST. Upon Kennedy's death, Vice President Lyndon B. Johnson becomes the 36th President of the United States. A few hours later, President Johnson is sworn in aboard Air Force One, as Kennedy's body is flown back to Washington, D.C. Stores and businesses shut down for the next four days, in tribute. 
 November 23 
 The Golden Age Nursing Home fire kills 63 elderly people near Fitchville, Ohio, United States.
 The long-running sci-fi television series Doctor Who premieres on BBC TV in the United Kingdom. 
 November 24
 Lee Harvey Oswald, alleged assassin of John F. Kennedy, is shot dead by Jack Ruby in Dallas, an event seen on live national television. 
 Vietnam War: New U.S. President Lyndon B. Johnson confirms that the United States intends to continue supporting South Vietnam militarily and economically.
 November 25 – State funeral of John F. Kennedy: President Kennedy is buried at Arlington National Cemetery. Schools around the nation cancel classes that day; millions watch the funeral on live international television. Lee Harvey Oswald's funeral takes place on the same day.
 November 29
 U.S. President Lyndon B. Johnson establishes the Warren Commission to investigate the assassination of John F. Kennedy.
 Trans-Canada Air Lines Flight 831, a Douglas DC-8 crashes into a wooded hillside after taking-off from Dorval International Airport near Montreal, killing all 118 on board, the worst air disaster for many years in Canada's history.
 Foundation stone for Mirzapur Cadet College is laid in East Pakistan (present-day Bangladesh).
 November 30 – 1963 Australian federal election: Robert Menzies' Liberal/Country Coalition Government is re-elected with an increased majority to an unprecedented eighth term in office, defeating the Labor Party led by Arthur Calwell. (This would be the final lower house election won by Menzies, who would retire from office during the term as the longest-serving Prime Minister in Australian history; he would be replaced by Harold Holt.)

December

December 3 – The Warren Commission begins its investigation into the assassination of US President John F. Kennedy.
 December 4 – The second period of the Second Vatican Council closes.
 December 5 – The Seliger Forschungs-und-Entwicklungsgesellschaft mbH demonstrates rockets for military use to military representatives of non-NATO-countries near Cuxhaven. Although these rockets land via parachute at the end of their flight and no allied laws are violated, the Soviet Union protests this action.
 December 7 – The first instant replay system to use videotape instead of film is used by Tony Verna, a CBS-TV director, during a live televised sporting event, the Army–Navy Game of college football played in Philadelphia, United States.
 December 8 – A lightning strike causes the crash of Pan Am Flight 214 near Elkton, Maryland, United States, killing 81 people.
 December 10
 Zanzibar gains independence from the United Kingdom, as a constitutional monarchy under Sultan Jamshid bin Abdullah.
 Chuck Yeager narrowly escapes death while testing an NF-104A rocket-augmented aerospace trainer when his aircraft goes out of control at 108,700 feet (nearly 21 miles up) and crashes. He parachutes to safety at 8,500 feet after vainly battling to gain control of the powerless, rapidly falling craft. In this incident he becomes the first pilot to make an emergency ejection in the full pressure suit needed for high altitude flights.
 December 12 – Kenya gains independence from the United Kingdom, with Jomo Kenyatta as prime minister.
 December 20 – The Frankfurt Auschwitz Trials begin.
 December 21 – Cyprus Emergency: Inter-communal fighting erupts between Greek and Turkish Cypriots.
 December 25 – İsmet İnönü of the Republican People's Party (CHP) forms the new government of Turkey (28th government, coalition partners; independents, İnönü has served ten times as a prime minister, this is his last government).
 December 31 – Federation of Rhodesia and Nyasaland dissolves.

Date unknown
 David H. Frisch and J.H. Smith prove that the radioactive decay of mesons is slowed by their motion (see Einstein's special relativity and general relativity).
 The TAT-3 transatlantic communications cable goes into operation.
 Ivan Sutherland writes the revolutionary Sketchpad program and runs it on the Lincoln TX-2 computer at Massachusetts Institute of Technology.
 Construction of Moscow's Ostankino Tower begins.
 The IEEE Computer Society is founded.
 The Urdu keyboard is standardised by the Central Language Board in Pakistan.
 Harvey Ball invents the ubiquitous smiley face symbol.
 The classic Porsche 911 is first produced.
 The Reformed Druids of North America is founded.
 Hergé's The Castafiore Emerald is published.
 Marvel releases their Superhero assembly team The Avengers

Births

January

 January 4 
 Dave Foley, Canadian actor and comedian
 Till Lindemann, German singer (Rammstein) 
 January 5 – Jiang Wen, Chinese actor, film director and screenwriter
 January 6 – Paul Kipkoech, Kenyan long-distance runner (d. 1995)
 January 10 – Kira Ivanova, Soviet Russian figure skater (d. 2001)
 January 11 
 Tracy Caulkins, American swimmer
 Petra Schneider, East German swimmer
 January 14 – Steven Soderbergh, American film director
 January 15 – Bruce Schneier, American cryptographer, cyber security expert, and writer
 January 16 – James May, English motoring journalist and television show host
 January 17 – Kai Hansen, German power metal guitarist and singer
 January 21 – Hakeem Olajuwon, Nigerian basketball player
 January 23 – Gail O'Grady, American actress
 January 25 – Fernando Haddad, Brazilian academic and politician
 January 26
 José Mourinho, Portuguese football manager
 Andrew Ridgeley, English singer

February 

 February 2 – Eva Cassidy, American vocalist (d. 1996)
 February 3 – Gretel Killeen, Australian journalist
 February 4 – Pirmin Zurbriggen, Swiss alpine skier
 February 6 
 David Capel, English cricketer (d. 2020)
 Cláudia Ohana, Brazilian actress and singer
 February 12 – John Michael Higgins, American actor and voice actor
 February 14 
 Enrico Colantoni, Canadian actor and director
 Alex Perry, Australian fashion designer
 February 15 – Shoucheng Zhang, Chinese-American physicist (d. 2018)
 February 16 – Claudio Amendola, Italian actor, television presenter and director
 February 17
 Jinggoy Estrada, Filipino politician, actor and film producer
 Michael Jordan, American basketball player
 Larry the Cable Guy, American actor and comedian 
 February 18 – Rob Andrew, English rugby union player
 February 19 – Seal, English singer
 February 20 – Charles Barkley, American basketball player
 February 21 – William Baldwin, American actor, producer and writer
 February 22 – Vijay Singh, Fijian golfer
 February 23 – Reza Abdoh, Iranian-American director and playwright (d. 1995)
 February 25 – Merab Katsitadze, retired Georgian professional football player
 February 27 – Virginie Boutaud, Brazilian singer and actress (Metrô, Virginie & Fruto Proibido)

March

 March 1
 Thomas Anders, German singer 
 Miss Shangay Lily, Spanish drag queen, writer, actor, and director (d. 2016)
 Aydan Şener, Turkish actress, model and beauty pageant
 March 2
 Anthony Albanese, 31st Prime Minister of Australia
 Tuff Hedeman, American PRCA World Champion Bull Rider
 March 3 – Martín Fiz, Spanish long-distance runner
 March 4 – Jason Newsted, American bassist 
 March 8 – Juan Gilberto Funes, Argentine footballer (d. 1992)
 March 9 - Jean-Marc Vallée, Canadian filmmaker and screenwriter (d. 2021)
March 10 
 Rick Rubin, American music producer
 Anna Maria Corazza Bildt, Italian politician
 March 11 
 Azem Hajdari, Albanian student leader (d. 1998)
 Alex Kingston, English actress
 David LaChapelle, American photographer 
 March 12 
 Farahnaz Pahlavi, Iranian princess
 Jake Weber, British actor
 Joaquim Cruz, Brazilian runner
 March 13 – Fito Páez, Argentine musician
 March 14
 Bruce Reid, Australian cricketer
 Mahiro Maeda, Japanese animator
 March 15 – Bret Michaels, American rock singer (Poison)
 March 16 – Kevin Smith, New Zealand actor (d. 2002)
 March 17 – Alex Fong, Hong Kong actor
 March 18
 Ratna Pathak, Indian actress
 Vanessa Williams, American beauty queen, actress and singer
 March 20
 Kathy Ireland, American actress and model
 David Thewlis, British actor
 March 21 – Ronald Koeman, Dutch football player and manager
 March 22
 Marty Natalegawa, Indonesian diplomat
 Ana Fidelia Quirot, Cuban middle distance runner
 Martín Vizcarra, Peruvian engineer and politician, 67th President of Peru
 March 23 – Jose Miguel Gonzalez Martin del Campo, Spanish football player
 March 25 – Auxillia Mnangagwa, Zimbabwean politician and First Lady of Zimbabwe
 March 26 – Natsuhiko Kyogoku, Japanese writer
 March 27
 Dave Koz, American jazz musician 
 Quentin Tarantino, American actor, director, writer and producer
 Xuxa, Brazilian television personality
 March 28
 Chieko Honda, Japanese voice actress (d. 2013)
 Bernice King, American activist, lawyer, and minister
 March 30 – Panagiotis Tsalouchidis, Greek footballer
 March 31 – Stephen Tataw, Cameroonian footballer (d. 2020)

April

 April 3 – Sarah Woodward, English actress 
 April 4
 Siraj Raisani, Pakistani politician (d. 2018)
 Dale Hawerchuk, Canadian ice hockey player (d. 2020)
 Graham Norton, Irish comedian and talk show host
 Frank Yallop, Canadian footballer
 April 6 
 Rafael Correa, President of Ecuador
 Clark Spencer, American film producer, businessman and studio executive
 Shaun Toub, Iranian-born American actor
 April 8 – Dean Norris, American actor
 April 9
 Marc Jacobs, American fashion designer
 Erdal Tosun, Turkish actor (d. 2016)
 April 10 – Doris Leuthard, Swiss politician and lawyer
 April 11 
 Mavis Agbandje-McKenna, Nigerian-born British biophysicist and virologist (d. 2021)
 Chris Ferguson, American poker player
 April 13 – Garry Kasparov, Russian chess player
 April 15
 Beata Szydło, Prime Minister of Poland
 Diosdado Cabello, Venezuelan politician
 April 16 – Jimmy Osmond, American singer
 April 18
 Universo 2000, Mexican professional wrestler (d. 2018)
 Eric McCormack, Canadian actor
 Conan O'Brien, American television entertainer and talk show host
 April 21 – Roy Dupuis, Canadian actor
 April 22 – Blanca Fernández Ochoa, Spanish ski racer (d. 2019)
 April 23 – Mohammad Ali Ramazani Dastak, Iranian politician (d. 2020)
 April 26 – Jet Li, Chinese martial artist and actor
 April 27– Russell T Davies, Welsh television producer and writer
 April 28 – Beate Grimsrud, Norwegian novelist and playwright (d. 2020)
 April 29 – Mike Babcock, Canadian ice hockey coach

May

 May 2 – Yoram Yosefsberg, Israeli actor and voice actor
 May 5 – James LaBrie, Canadian vocalist (Dream Theater)
 May 8 – Anthony Field, Australian musician, member of The Wiggles
 May 9 – Gary Daniels, British martial artist and actor
 May 10 
 Rich Moore, American film and television animation director, screenwriter and voice actor
 Lisa Nowak, American naval flight officer and NASA astronaut 
 A. Raja, Indian politician
 May 11
 Roark Critchlow, Canadian actor
 Natasha Richardson, British-American actress (d. 2009)
 May 16 – Mercedes Echerer, Austrian actress and politician
 May 21 – Kevin Shields, Irish-American singer (My Bloody Valentine)
 May 24
 Michael Chabon, American author
 Joe Dumars, American basketball player
 May 25
 Mike Myers, Canadian actor and comedian
 Eha Rünne, Estonian shot putter and discus thrower
 May 26
 Clive Cowdery, English insurance entrepreneur
 Musetta Vander, South African actress
 May 29
 Débora Bloch, Brazilian actress
 Ukyo Katayama, Japanese racing driver
 May 31 – Viktor Orbán, Prime Minister of Hungary

June

 June 1 – David Westhead, English actor and producer
 June 2 – Bernard Cazeneuve, Prime Minister of France
 June 3 – Alessandra Karpoff, Italian voice actress
 June 4
 Sean Fitzpatrick, New Zealand rugby union player
 mossimo giannulli, American fashion designer
 June 5 – Joe Rudán, Hungarian heavy metal singer
 June 6 – Jason Isaacs, British actor
 June 9 – Johnny Depp, American actor and film director
 June 10 – Jeanne Tripplehorn, American actress
 June 11 – Chic Charnley, Scottish footballer
 June 12 – Warwick Capper, Australian rules footballer
 June 13 – Bettina Bunge, German tennis player
 June 14 – Rambo Amadeus, Montenegrin singer-songwriter
 June 15
 Helen Hunt, American actress
 Lourdes Valera, Venezuelan actress
 June 17 – Greg Kinnear, American actor
 June 18
 Juan Chioran, Argentine-Canadian actor
 Rumen Radev, President of Bulgaria
 June 19 – Laura Ingraham, American television host
 June 21
 Tiger Huang, Taiwanese popular singer
 Rene Medvešek, Croatian actor
 Jan Pinkava, Czech director and writer
 June 22 
 Randy Couture, American mixed martial arts fighter and actor
 Hokutoumi Nobuyoshi, Japanese sumo wrestler 
 John Tenta, Canadian wrestler (d. 2006)
 June 23
 Marianne Berglund, Swedish road racing cyclist
 Laureen Harper, wife of Prime Minister of Canada Stephen Harper
 Shin Ji-ho, South Korean politician
 Liu Cixin, Chinese science fiction writer
 Márcio França, Brazilian lawyer and politician
 Colin Montgomerie, Scottish golfer
 June 24
 Preki, Serbia-born American footballer
 Sükhbaataryn Batbold, Mongolian politician
 Jascha Richter, Danish single and songwriter, frontman of Michael Learns to Rock
 June 25
 Doug Gilmour, Canadian hockey player
 Yann Martel, Canadian author
 George Michael, British singer-songwriter (d. 2016)
 June 26
 Mikhail Khodorkovsky, Russian businessman, activist and oligarch
 Farukh Ruzimatov, Russian ballet dancer
 June 27
 Gerrit Plomp, Dutch football defender
 Miroslav Šindelka, Slovak director, writer and producer
 June 28 – Wisit Sasanatieng, Thai film director and screenwriter
 June 29 
 Anne-Sophie Mutter, German violinist
 Thomas W. Gabrielsson, Swedish actor
 Mark Bourneville, New Zealand rugby league player
 Rupert Graves, English actor
 Yngwie Malmsteen, Swedish guitarist, composer and bandleader
 Vladimir Vermezović, Serbian football player and coach
 Judith Hoag, American actress

July

 July 1
 Naser Khader, Danish-Syrian politician 
 Igor Zhelezovski, Belarusian speed skater
 Zhang Zhicheng, Chinese fencer
 July 2 – Faiq Al Sheikh Ali, Iraqi lawyer and politician
 July 3 – Zainudin Nordin, Singaporean politician
 July 4 
 Henri Leconte, French tennis player
 R.S. Thanenthiran, Malaysian politician and businessman
 July 5
 Edie Falco, American actress
 Zbigniew Hoffmann, Polish politician
 July 6 – Sorin Matei, Romanian high jumper
 July 7
 Othman Abdul, Malaysian politician
 Vonda Shepard, American pop/rock singer, songwriter and actress
 Doug Dunakey, American golfer
 Fermín Alvarado Arroyo, Mexican politician
 Janni Larsen, Danish female darts player
 José María Larrañaga, Peruvian swimmer
 Rakeysh Omprakash Mehra, Indian filmmaker and screenwriter
 July 8
 Michael Cuesta, American film and television director
 Luis de Jesús Rodríguez, Dominican attorney, businessman and entrepreneur
 Dmitry Pevtsov, Russian actor
 July 9 – Marc Mero, American amateur boxer and professional wrestler
 July 10
 Fatemeh Goudarzi, Iranian actress
 Ian Lougher, British motorcycle racer
 John Altschuler, American television and film producer and writer 
 July 11
 Al MacInnis, Canadian ice hockey player
 Manuel Marrero Cruz, Cuban politician; Prime Minister of Cuba 
 Lisa Rinna, American actress
 July 12
 Bertus Servaas, Polish entrepreneur
 Aleksandr Domogarov, Russian actor
 Andrés Roemer, Mexican diplomat
 July 13 
 Kenny Johnson, American actor, producer, and model
 Spud Webb, American basketball player
 July 14 – Wouter Bos, Dutch politician
 July 15
 Steve Thomas, British-Canadian retired ice hockey player
 Brigitte Nielsen, Danish actress
 Joy Smithers, Australian actress
 July 16
 Phoebe Cates, American actress
 Mikael Pernfors, Swedish tennis player
 Srečko Katanec, Slovenian football manager and player
 Goran Pandurović, Serbian footballer
 July 17
 Suha Arafat, widow of Yasser Arafat
 King Letsie III of Lesotho
 Matti Nykänen, Finnish ski jumper (d. 2019)
 July 18 – Martín Torrijos, President of Panama
 July 19 – Sándor Wladár, Hungarian swimmer
 July 20 
 Alexander Zhulin, Russian ice dancing coach and competitor
 Gbenga Aluko, Nigerian politician
 Adoni Maropis, Greek-American actor
 Roy Cheung, Hong Kong actor
 July 21 – Giant Silva, Brazilian national basketball player, mixed martial artist and professional wrestler
 July 22
 Joanna Going, American actress
 Rob Estes, American actor 
 Emilio Butragueño, Spanish football player
 July 23 – Slobodan Živojinović, Serbian tennis player
 July 24 – Karl Malone, American professional basketball player
 July 27 – Donnie Yen, Hong Kong actor and martial artist
 July 28 – Beverley Craven, British singer-songwriter
 July 29
 Jim Beglin, Irish football commentator
 Alexandra Paul, American actress, activist, health coach, and former model
 July 30
 Lisa Kudrow, American actress
 Chris Mullin, American basketball player, coach, and executive
 Gisèle Meygret, French fencer (d. 1999)
 Mandakini (aka Yasmeen Joseph), Indian Bollywood actress
 July 31
 Fatboy Slim, English DJ, musician, and record producer
 Martin H. Wiggers, German economist, editor, author and businessman

August

 August 1
 Coolio, American rapper (d. 2022)
 Demián Bichir, Mexican-American actor
 John Carroll Lynch, American actor and film director 
 August 3
 Tasmin Archer, English singer
 James Hetfield, American musician (Metallica)
 August 4 – Keith Ellison, American politician and lawyer
 August 5
 Mark Strong, English actor
 Doris Schröder-Köpf, German journalist 
 August 6 – Kevin Mitnick, American computer hacker
 August 7
 Hiroaki Hirata, Japanese voice actor
 Harold Perrineau, American actor
 Wendy van der Plank, Welsh actress
 August 9 – Whitney Houston, American singer (d. 2012)
 August 13
 Sridevi, Indian actress (d. 2018)
 Édouard Michelin, French businessman (d. 2006)
 Valerie Plame, American writer and spy novelist
 August 14 – Emmanuelle Béart, French actress
 August 15
 Alejandro González Iñárritu, Mexican film director, producer and screenwriter
 Valery Levaneuski, entrepreneur, politician and political prisoner
 August 16 – Christine Cavanaugh, American actress and voice actress (d. 2014)
 August 17 – James Whitbourn, British composer
 August 18 – Heino Ferch, German actor
 August 19
 Marcos Palmeira, Brazilian actor
 John Stamos, American actor
 Joey Tempest, Swedish singer-songwriter (Europe)
 August 21
 King Mohammed VI of Morocco
 August 22 – Tori Amos, American singer
 August 23
 Glória Pires, Brazilian actress
 Hans-Henning Fastrich, German field hockey player
 Laura Flores, Mexican actress, hostess and singer
 Park Chan-wook, South Korean film director and screenwriter 
 August 24 – Hideo Kojima, Japanese director, screenwriter, video game designer and video game producer
 August 25 – Miro Cerar, 10th Prime Minister of Slovenia
 August 26
 Liu Huan, Chinese singer
 Michael Tao, Hong Kong actor
 August 30
 Michael Chiklis, American actor
 Phil Mills, British racing driver
 August 31 – Todd Carty, Irish actor

September

 September 2 - Tio Pakusadewo, Indonesian actor
 September 6
 Betsy Russell, American actress 
 Geert Wilders, Dutch politician and critic of Islam
 September 8 – Li Ning, Chinese gymnast
 September 9 – Markus Wasmeier, German alpine-skier
 September 10
 Randy Johnson, American baseball player
 Jay Laga'aia, New Zealand-Australian actor and singer
 Gabriel Tiacoh, Ivorian sprinter (d. 1992) 
 September 11 – Gabriela Goldsmith, Mexican actress
 September 12 – Michael McElhatton, Irish actor and writer
 September 14 – Robert Herjavec, Canadian businessman, investor and television personality
 September 16
 Andréa Beltrão, Brazilian actress 
 Richard Marx, American pop/rock singer
 September 17 – Masahiro Chono, Japanese professional wrestler
 September 18
 Christopher Heyerdahl, Canadian actor
 John Powell, English-American composer, conductor, pianist, and record producer
 Dan Povenmire, American animator, producer and voice actor
 September 19
 Jarvis Cocker, English rock musician (Pulp)
 David Seaman, English football goalkeeper
 September 21
 Cecil Fielder, American baseball player
 Angus Macfadyen, Scottish actor
 Mamoru Samuragochi, Japanese impostor
 September 23 – Michiru Yamane, Japanese composer
 September 25 – Tate Donovan, American actor and director
 September 29
 Dave Andreychuk, Canadian hockey player
 Les Claypool, American bassist (Primus)

October

 October 1 
 Mark McGwire, American baseball player
 Iriana Joko Widodo, 7th First Lady of Indonesia, wife of Joko Widodo
 October 2 – Maria Ressa, Filipina American campaigning journalist, Nobel Prize laureate
 October 4 – Marcelo Buquet, Uruguayan-Mexican actor, previously model
 October 5 –Dame Laura Davies, English golfer
 October 6 – Elisabeth Shue, American actress
 October 10
 Anita Mui, Hong Kong singer (d. 2003)
 Daniel Pearl, American journalist (d. 2002)
 Jolanda de Rover, Dutch swimmer
 Vegard Ulvang, Norwegian cross-country skier
 October 11 – Ronny Rosenthal, Israeli footballer 
 October 12 – Satoshi Kon, Japanese anime director (d. 2010)
 October 14 – Alan McDonald, Northern Irish footballer
 October 19 
 Prince Laurent of Belgium
 Sinitta, Anglo-American singer
 October 20
 Domingos Simões Pereira, 16th Prime Minister of Guinea-Bissau 
 Gisela Kozak, Venezuelan writer and essayist. 
 Julie Payette, Canadian astronaut and Governor General of Canada
 October 21 – Marisa Orth, Brazilian actress, singer and TV host
 October 22 – Brian Boitano, American figure skater
 October 23 – Wilson Yip, Hong Kong actor and director
 October 25 – John Levén, Swedish bassist (Europe)
 October 26 
Tom Cavanagh, Canadian actor and director
Natalie Merchant, American singer-songwriter
 October 27 
 Sergey Smiryagin, Russian freestyle swimmer (d. 2020)
 Feyyaz Uçar, Turkish footballer
 Farin Urlaub, German singer, band Die Ärzte
 Marla Maples, American actress and television personality
 October 28 – Lauren Holly, American actress
 October 31
 Johnny Marr, English musician
 Dermot Mulroney, American actor
 Rob Schneider, American actor, comedian and film director

November

 November 1
 Rick Allen, British rock musician (Def Leppard)
 Mark Hughes, Welsh football player & manager
 Katja Riemann, German actress
 November 2
 Brian Kemp, American politician, 83rd Governor of Georgia
 Craig Saavedra, American filmmaker
 Borut Pahor, incumbent President of Slovenia
 November 4 – Lena Zavaroni, Scottish entertainer (d. 1999)
 November 5 – Tatum O'Neal, American actress and author
 November 7 – John Barnes, Jamaican-born English footballer
 November 8 – Paul Butcher, American football linebacker
 November 10
 Hugh Bonneville, British actor
 Mike Powell, American long jumper
 November 11 – Billy Gunn, American professional wrestler
 November 15 – Benny Elias, Australian rugby league player
 November 18 – Peter Schmeichel, Danish-born football goalkeeper
 November 19
 Jon Potter, British field hockey player
 Terry Farrell, American actress
 November 20 – Ming-Na Wen, Macanese-American actress
 November 21 – Nicollette Sheridan, English actress
 November 23
 Erika Buenfil, Mexican actress, TV host and singer
 Yoshino Takamori, Japanese voice actress
 November 25 – Holly Cole, Canadian jazz singer
 November 28 – Matt Parkinson, Australian comedian, actor, radio presenter, and game show personality

December

 December 2 – Ann Patchett, American novelist
 December 4 – Sergey Bubka, Ukrainian pole vaulter
 December 7 
 Mark Bowen, Welsh footballer
 Saifuddin Nasution Ismail, Malaysian politician
 Paul Dobson, British voice actor
 December 8
 Greg Howe, American guitarist
 Toshiaki Kawada, Japanese professional wrestler
 December 9
 Empress Masako, Empress of Japan
 Bárbara Palacios, Miss Universe 1986
 December 12 
 Juan Carlos Varela, Panamian politician and 37th President of Panama
 Ai Orikasa, Japanese voice actress
 December 13
 Uwe-Jens Mey, German speed skater
 Jake White, South African rugby coach
 December 14
 Cynthia Gibb, American actress
 Vytautas Juozapaitis, Lithuanian baritone, professor and television host
 December 15 – Helen Slater, American actress, singer and songwriter
 December 16
 Benjamin Bratt, American actor
 Jeff Carson, American singer
 Bärbel Schäfer, German television presenter and talk show host
 December 18
 Pauline Ester, French singer
 Rikiya Koyama, Japanese voice actor
 Charles Oakley, American basketball player
 Brad Pitt, American actor and film producer, co-founder of Plan B Entertainment
 December 19 
 Jennifer Beals, American actress
 Til Schweiger, German actor
 December 20
 Infanta Elena, Duchess of Lugo
 Joel Gretsch, American actor 
 December 21
 Donovan Ruddock, Jamaican Canadian former professional boxer
 Govinda Ahuja, Indian actor and politician
 Jacques Simonet, Belgian politician (d. 2007)
 Chua Tian Chang, Malaysian politician
 December 22
 Vladimir Flórez, Colombian cartoonist
 Bryan Gunn, Scottish footballer
 Russell Lewis, British child actor and television writer
 Luna H. Mitani, Japanese-American Surrealist painter
 December 23 – Donna Tartt, American author
 December 24
 Sanjay Mehrotra, Indian entrepreneur
 Caroline Aherne, English actress, comedienne and writer (d. 2016)
 December 26 – Lars Ulrich, Danish rock drummer (Metallica)
 December 29
 Graciano Rocchigiani, German professional boxer (d. 2018)
 Francisco Bustamante, Filipino billiard player
 Sean Payton, American football coach
 Ulf Kristersson, 35th Prime Minister of Sweden
 December 30 – Kim Hill, American Christian singer
 December 31 – Azalina Othman Said, Malaysian politician

Deaths

January

 January 2
 Jack Carson, Canadian actor (b. 1910)
 Dick Powell, American actor (b. 1904)
 January 3 – Shinobu Ishihara, Japanese ophthalmologist (b. 1879)
 January 5 – Erik Strandmark, Swedish film actor (b. 1919)
 January 6 – Frank Tuttle, American film director (b. 1892)
 January 7 – Erik Lundqvist, Swedish athlete (b. 1908)
 January 9 – Enea Bossi, Sr., Italian-born American aerospace engineer and aviation pioneer (b. 1888)
 January 10 – Franz Planer,  Austrian film cinematographer (b. 1894)
 January 13
 Sonny Clark, American jazz pianist (b. 1931)
 Sylvanus Olympio, Togolese politician, 1st President of Togo (assassinated) (b. 1902)
 Ramón Gómez de la Serna, Spanish writer (b. 1888)
 January 14 – Gustav Regler, German socialist novelist (b. 1898)
 January 15 – Cesare Fantoni, Italian actor and voice actor (b. 1905)
 January 18
 Hugh Gaitskell, British politician, leader of the Labour Party (b. 1906)
 Edward Charles Titchmarsh, British mathematician (b. 1899)
 January 20 
 Fyodor Terentyev, Soviet Olympic cross-country skier (b. 1925)
 Avra Theodoropoulou, Greek suffragist (b. 1880)
 January 21 – Al St. John, American actor (b. 1892)
 January 23
 Mohammad Ali Bogra, Pakistani statesman, politician and diplomat, 3rd Prime Minister of Pakistan (b. 1909)
 Józef Gosławski, Polish sculptor and medallic artist (b. 1908)
 January 24
 Otto Harbach, American lyricist and librettist (b. 1873)
 Kenneth Western, part of The Western Brothers (b. 1899)
 January 25 – Marion Sunshine, American actress (b. 1894)
 January 26 – Ole Olsen, American actor (b. 1892)
 January 27 – John Farrow, Australian-born American film director (b. 1904)
 January 29
 Anthony Coldeway, American screenwriter (b. 1887)
 Robert Frost, American poet (b. 1874)
 Lee Meadows, American baseball player (b. 1894)
 Isaías de Noronha, 13th President of Brazil (b. 1874)
 January 30
 Jane Gail, American silent movie and stage actress (b. 1890)
 Francis Poulenc, French composer (b. 1899)
 January 31 – Alasgar Alakbarov, Azerbaijani actor (b. 1910)

February

 February 1
 Louis D. Lighton, American screenwriter and producer (b. 1895)
 Wyndham Standing, English actor (b. 1880)
 February 2 – William Gaxton, American vaudeville, film and theatre performer (b. 1893)
 February 6 
 Abd el-Krim, Riffian political and military leader (b. 1882)
 Piero Manzoni, Italian artist (b. 1933)
 February 8
 George Dolenz, American actor (b. 1908)
 Ernst Glaeser, German writer (b. 1902)
 February 9 – Abd al-Karim Qasim, Iraqi general, 24th Prime Minister of Iraq (executed) (b. 1914)
 February 11 – Sylvia Plath, American poet and novelist (b. 1932)
 February 15
 Edgardo Donato, Uruguayan tango composer and orchestra leader (b. 1897)
 Louis J. Gasnier, French film director (b. 1875)
 Bump Hadley, Major League Baseball pitcher (b. 1904)
 February 16
 Else Jarlbak, Danish film actress (b. 1911)
 László Lajtha, Hungarian composer, ethnomusicologist and conductor (b. 1892)
 February 18
 Monte Blue, American actor (b. 1887)
 Beppe Fenoglio, Italian writer (b. 1887)
 Fernando Tambroni, Italian politician and 36th Prime Minister of Italy (b. 1901)
 Tokugawa Iemasa, Japanese politician, 17th head of the Tokugawa shogunate (b. 1884)
 Zareh I, Armenian Catholicos of Cilicia (b. 1915)
 February 19 – Benny Moré, Cuban singer (b. 1919)
 February 20
 Ferenc Fricsay, Hungarian conductor (b. 1914)
 Jacob Gade, Danish violinist and composer (b. 1879)
 Bill Hinchman, American baseball player (b. 1883)
 February 22 – Arthur Guy Empey, American soldier (in British service), author, screenwriter and actor (b. 1883)
 February 24 – Herbert Asbury, American journalist and writer (b. 1889)
 February 25 – Melville J. Herskovits, American anthropologist (b. 1895)
 February 28
 Rajendra Prasad, Indian politician, 1st President of India (b. 1884)
 Eppa Rixey, American baseball player (Cincinnati Reds) and a member of the MLB Hall of Fame (b. 1891)

March

 March 1 – Irish Meusel, American baseball player (b. 1893)
 March 4 – William Carlos Williams, American writer (b. 1883)
 March 5
 Patsy Cline, American singer (b. 1932)
 Ludde Gentzel, Swedish film actor (b. 1885)
 Cyril Smith, Scottish actor (b. 1892)
 Ahmed Lutfi el-Sayed, Egyptian intellectual and anti-colonial activist (b. 1872)
 March 6 – Robert E. Cornish, scientist (b. 1903)
 March 7 – Joachim Holst-Jensen, Norwegian film actor (b. 1880)
 March 11
 Ignat Bednarik, Romanian painter (b. 1882)
 Joe Judge, American baseball player (b. 1894)
 March 16 
 Archduchess Elisabeth Marie of Austria (b. 1883)
 William Beveridge, British economist (b. 1879)
 March 17
 Thomas Lennon, screenwriter (b. 1896)
 Lizzie Miles, American blues singer (b. 1895)
 March 18
 Sir Hubert Gough, British general (b. 1870)
 Wanda Hawley, American actress (b. 1895)
 March 20 – Manuel Arteaga y Betancourt, Cuban Roman Catholic cardinal (b. 1879)
 March 21 – Felice Minotti, Italian film actor (b. 1887)
 March 22
 Cilly Aussem, German tennis champion (b. 1909)
 Abraham Ellstein, American composer (b. 1907)
 Mihály Székely, Hungarian bass singer (b. 1901)
 March 23 – Thoralf Skolem, Norwegian mathematician (b. 1887)
 March 25 – Felix Adler, American screenwriter (b. 1884)
 March 26 – Jean Bruce, French writer (b. 1921)
 March 27 – Harry Piel, German actor, film director, screenwriter and film producer (b. 1892)
 March 28
 Antoine Balpêtré, French film actor (b. 1898)
 Frank J. Marion, American motion picture pioneer (b. 1869)
 March 29
 Pola Gojawiczyńska, Polish writer (b. 1896)
 Henry Bordeaux, French writer and lawyer (b. 1870)
 March 31 
 Harry Akst, American songwriter (b. 1894)
 Sir Harold Franklyn, British army general (b. 1885)

April

 April 1 – Agnes Mowinckel, Norwegian actress and stage producer (b. 1875)
 April 3 – Alma Richards, American Olympic gold medalist (b. 1890)
 April 4
 Gaetano Catanoso, Italian Roman Catholic priest and saint (b. 1879)
 Jason Robards Sr., American stage and screen actor, heart attack (b. 1892)
 Oskari Tokoi, leader of the Social Democratic Party of Finland (b. 1873)
 April 5 – Mario Fabrizi, comedian and actor, stress-related illness (b. 1924)
 April 6 – Otto Struve, Russian–American astronomer (b. 1897)
 April 7 – Amedeo Maiuri, Italian archaeologist (b. 1886)
 April 9
 Eddie Edwards, American jazz trombonist (b. 1891)
 Benno Moiseiwitsch, Jewish-Ukrainian pianist (b. 1890)
 Xul Solar, Argentine painter, sculptor, writer (b. 1887)
 April 11 – Nando Bruno, Italian film actor (b. 1895)
 April 12
 Nicolette Bruining, Dutch theologian and humanitarian (b. 1886)
 Felix Manalo, 1st Executive Minister, Iglesia ni Cristo (b. 1886)
 Herbie Nichols, American jazz pianist and composer (b. 1919)
 April 14
 Abdel Messih El-Makari, Egyptian Coptic Orthodox monk, priest and saint (b. 1892)
 Arthur Jonath, German Olympic athlete (b. 1909)
 Kodō Nomura, Japanese novelist and music critic (b. 1882)
 Mahapandit Rahul Sankrityayan, Indian historian, writer and scholar (b. 1893)
 April 23
 Yitzhak Ben-Zvi, Israel historian and politician, 2nd President of Israel (b. 1884)
 Ferruccio Cerio, Italian film writer and director (b. 1904)
 Paul Fejos, Hungarian film director (b. 1897)
 Harry Harper, American baseball player (b. 1895)
 Don C. Harvey, American television and film actor (b. 1911)
 Frederick Peters, American film actor (b. 1884)
 William Lewis Moore, American postal worker (b. 1927)
 April 24
 Rino Corso Fougier, Italian air force general (b. 1894)
 Leonid Lukov, Soviet film director and screenwriter (b. 1909)
 April 26 – Roland Pertwee, English playwright, screenwriter, director and actor (b. 1885)
 April 27 – Kenneth Macgowan, American film producer (b. 1888)
 April 30
 Giovanni Grasso, Italian film actor (b. 1888)
 William C. Mellor, American cinematographer, heart attack (b. 1903)
 Bryant Washburn, American film actor, heart attack (b. 1889)

May

 May 1 – Lope K. Santos, Filipino writer, Father of Philippine National Language and Grammar (b. 1879)
 May 2 – Van Wyck Brooks, American literary critic and writer (b. 1886)
 May 5 – Mohamed Khemisti, Minister of Foreign Affairs of Algeria (assassinated) (b. 1930)
 May 6 
 Theodore von Kármán, Hungarian-American engineer and physicist (b. 1881)
 Monty Woolley, American actor (b. 1888)
 May 11 – Herbert Spencer Gasser, American physiologist, Nobel Prize laureate (b. 1888)
 May 12
 Robert Kerr, Canadian Olympic athlete (b. 1882)
 A. W. Tozer, American Protestant pastor (b. 1897)
 May 16 – Oleg Penkovsky, Soviet military officer & spy (b. 1919)
 May 18 – Ernie Davis, American football player, first African-American to win the Heisman Trophy (b. 1939)
 May 24 – Elmore James, American blues guitarist (b. 1918)
 May 25 – Mehdi Frashëri, Albanian politician, 15th Prime Minister of Albania (b. 1872)
 May 28 – Ion Agârbiceanu, Romanian writer, journalist, politician and priest (b. 1882)
 May 29 – Netta Muskett, British novelist (b. 1887)
 May 31 – Edith Hamilton, German-born author (b. 1867)

June

 June 3
 Pope John XXIII (b. 1881)
 Nâzım Hikmet, Turkish poet (b. 1902)
 June 5 – Adrian Carton de Wiart, English general (b. 1880)

 June 6 – William Baziotes, American painter (b. 1912)
 June 7 – ZaSu Pitts, American actress (b. 1894)
 June 9
 Antony Thachuparambil, Indian Syro-Malabar Catholic priest and servant of God (b. 1894)
 Jacques Villon, French painter (b. 1875)
 June 10 – Anita King, American actress and race-car driver (b. 1884)
 June 11
 Thích Quảng Đức, Vietnamese Buddhist monk (suicide) (b. 1897)
 Syed Abdul Rahim, First Indian national football manager (b. 1909)
 Alfred V. Kidder, American archaeologist (b. 1885)
 June 12 
 Medgar Evers, American civil rights activist (b. 1925) 
 Andrew Cunningham, British admiral (b. 1883) 
 June 17
 Alan Brooke, 1st Viscount Alanbrooke, British Field Marshal (b. 1883)
Sir Robert Hudson, Governor of Southern Rhodesia (b. 1885)
 John Cowper Powys, British novelist (b. 1872)
 June 18 – Pedro Armendáriz, Mexican actor (b. 1912)
 June 19 – Amy Hannah Adamson, Australian principal (b. 1893)
 June 24 – Maria Guadalupe Garcia Zavala, Mexican Roman Catholic religious professed and saint (b. 1878)
 June 27 – John Maurice Clark, American economist (b. 1884)
 June 28 – Frank Baker, American baseball player (Philadelphia Athletics) and a member of the MLB Hall of Fame (b. 1886)

July
 July 1 – Sultan Abdullah bin Khalifa of Zanzibar (b. 1910)
 July 4 – Bernard Freyberg, 1st Baron Freyberg, British army general and Governor-General of New Zealand (b. 1889)
 July 6 – George, Duke of Mecklenburg, head of the House of Mecklenburg-Strelitz (b. 1899)
 July 7 – Frank P. Lahm, American aviator (b. 1877)
 July 22 – Albertus Soegijapranata, Indonesian Jesuit priest (b. 1896)
 July 27 – Garrett Morgan, American inventor (b. 1877)

August

 August 1 – Theodore Roethke, American poet (b. 1908)
 August 4 – Tom Keene, American actor (b. 1896)
 August 10 – Estes Kefauver, American politician (b. 1903)
 August 11 
 Clem Bevans, American actor (b. 1880)
 Tanxu, Chinese Buddhist monk (b. 1875)
 August 14 – Clifford Odets, American dramatist (b. 1906)
 August 17 – Richard Barthelmess, American actor (b. 1895)
 August 22 – William Morris, 1st Viscount Nuffield, British businessman and philanthropist (b. 1877)
 August 23 
 Mary Gordon, Scottish actress (b. 1882)
 Larry Keating, American actor (b. 1899)
 August 24 – James Kirkwood, Sr., American film director (b. 1875)
 August 27
 W. E. B. Du Bois, American civil rights activist (b. 1868)
 Inayatullah Khan Mashriqi, Indian founder of the Khaksar Movement (b. 1888)
 August 30 – Guy Burgess, British spy, one of the Cambridge Five (b. 1911)
 August 31 – Georges Braque, French painter (b. 1882)

September

 September 4 – Robert Schuman, French statesman, a founding father of the European Union (b. 1886)
 September 9 – Edwin Linkomies, 25th Prime Minister of Finland (b. 1894)
 September 11
 Claude Fuess, American author, historian and headmaster (b. 1885)
 Richard Oswald, Austrian director, producer, and screenwriter (b. 1880)
 Suzanne Duchamp, French painter (b. 1889)
 September 17 – Eduard Spranger, German philosopher and psychologist (b. 1882)
 September 19 – David Low, New Zealand cartoonist (b. 1891)
 September 22 – Bernadette Cattanéo, French trade unionist and communist activist (b. 1899)
 September 25
 Alexander Sakharoff, Russian dancer and choreographer (b. 1886)
 Kurt Zeitzler, German Army officer (b. 1895)
 September 30 – Paul Alexiu, Romanian general (b. 1893)

October

 October 4 
 Lloyd Fredendall, American general (b. 1883)
 Kate Gordon Moore, American psychologist (b. 1878)
 October 7 – Gustaf Gründgens, German actor (b. 1899)
 October 9 – Friedrich, Hereditary Prince of Anhalt (b. 1938)
 October 10 – Édith Piaf, French singer and actress (b. 1915)
 October 11 – Jean Cocteau, French writer (b. 1889)
 October 15 – Alan Goodrich Kirk, American admiral (b. 1888)
 October 20 – Diana Churchill, daughter of Winston Churchill (b. 1909)
 October 21 – Jean Decoux, French admiral, Governor-General of French Indochina (1940-1945) (b. 1884)
 October 24
 Karl Bühler, German psychologist and linguist (b. 1879)
 Beverly Wills, American actress (b. 1933)
 October 25 
 Roger Désormière, French conductor (b. 1898)
 Björn Þórðarson, 9th Prime Minister of Iceland (b. 1879)
 Karl von Terzaghi, Austrian civil engineer and "father of soil mechanics" (b. 1883) 
 October 28 – Jack E. Bairstow, American politician and lawyer (b. 1902)
 October 29 – Adolphe Menjou, American actor (b. 1890)
 October 30
 Domhnall Ua Buachalla, Irish politician (b. 1866)
 Saburō Hyakutake, Japanese admiral (b. 1872)
 October 31 – Henry Daniell, English actor (b. 1894)

November

 November 1
 Hồ Tấn Quyền, South Vietnamese Navy officer (assassinated) (b. 1927)
 Lê Quang Tung, South Vietnamese Army officer (assassinated) (b. 1923)
 Elsa Maxwell, American gossip columnist and hostess (b. 1883) 
 November 2
 Ngô Đình Diệm, South Vietnamese politician, 1st President of the Republic of Vietnam (South Vietnam) (assassinated) (b. 1901) 
 Ngô Đình Nhu, South Vietnamese politician (assassinated) (b. 1910)
 November 4 – Pascual Ortiz Rubio, Mexican politician, substitute President of Mexico 1930-1932 (b. 1877)
 November 5 – Luis Cernuda, Spanish poet (b. 1902)
 November 12
José María Gatica, Argentine boxer (b. 1925)
John R. Hodge, United States Army general (b. 1893)
 November 15 – Fritz Reiner, Hungarian conductor (b. 1888)
 November 16 – Albert H. Pearson, American politician (b. 1920)
 November 19 – Carmen Amaya, Spanish dancer (b. 1918)
 November 21 – Robert Stroud, American prisoner, known as the "Birdman of Alcatraz" (b. 1890)
 November 22
 Wilhelm Beiglböck, German Nazi physician at Dachau concentration camp (b. 1905)
 Aldous Huxley, British writer (Brave New World) (b. 1894)
 John F. Kennedy, American politician, 35th President of the United States (assassinated) (b. 1917)
 C. S. Lewis, Irish-born British critic, novelist (The Chronicles of Narnia) and Christian apologist (b. 1898)
 November 23 – John Baumgarten, American businessman and politician (b. 1902)
 November 24 – Lee Harvey Oswald, American assassin of President John F. Kennedy (murdered) (b. 1939)
 November 26 – Amelita Galli-Curci, Italian opera singer (b. 1882)
 November 28 – Ernesto Lecuona, Cuban composer (b. 1896)
 November 30 
 Phil Baker, American comedian and radio personality (b. 1896)
 Cyril Newall, 1st Baron Newall, British Air Marshal and State servant, 6th Governor-General of New Zealand (b. 1886)

December

 December – Andy Kennedy, Northern Ireland footballer (b. 1897)
 December 2
 Sabu Dastagir, Indian-American actor (b. 1924)
 Thomas Hicks, American runner (b. 1875)
 December 5 – Karl Amadeus Hartmann, German composer (b. 1905)
 December 10 – K. M. Panikkar, Indian scholar, diplomat and journalist (b. 1895)
 December 12
 Theodor Heuss, German politician, 5th President of Germany (b. 1884)
 Yasujirō Ozu, Japanese filmmaker (b. 1903)
 December 14
 Hubert Pierlot, Belgian lawyer and jurist, 32nd Prime Minister of Belgium, leader of the Belgian government in exile (b. 1883)
 Dinah Washington, American jazz/blues singer (b. 1924)
 December 15 – Rikidōzan, Korean-born Japanese professional wrestler (b. 1924)
 December 21 – Sir Jack Hobbs, English cricketer (b. 1882)
 December 25 – Tristan Tzara, French poet (b. 1896)
 December 26 – Gorgeous George, American professional wrestler (b. 1915)
 December 28
 Paul Hindemith, German composer (b. 1895)
 A. J. Liebling, American journalist (b. 1904)

Nobel Prizes

Physics – Eugene Wigner, Maria Goeppert-Mayer and J. Hans D. Jensen
Chemistry – Karl Ziegler and Giulio Natta
Physiology or Medicine – Sir John Carew Eccles, Alan Lloyd Hodgkin and Andrew Huxley
Literature – Giorgos Seferis
Peace – International Committee of the Red Cross, League of Red Cross Societies

References